Franz Ritter von Soxhlet (January 12, 1848 Brno – May 5, 1926 Munich) was a German agricultural chemist from Brno. He invented the Soxhlet extractor in 1879 and in 1886 he proposed pasteurization be applied to milk and other beverages. Soxhlet is also known as the first scientist who fractionated the milk proteins in casein, albumin, globulin and lactoprotein. Furthermore, he described for the first time the sugar present in milk, lactose. The Soxhlet solution is an alternative to Fehling's solution for preparation of a comparable cupric/tartrate reagent to test for reducing sugars.

He was the son of a Belgian immigrant. He gained a PhD at Leipzig in 1872. In 1879 he became a professor of agricultural chemistry at the Technical University of Munich.

References
 Rosenau, M.J.: The Milk Question, Houghton Mifflin Company, Boston, 1913.
 Soxhlet, F.: Die gewichtsanalytische Bestimmung des Milchfettes, Polytechnisches J. (Dingler's) 1879, 232, 461
 Rommel, Otto: Franz von Soxhlet Münchener Medizinische Wochenschrift 73 (1926) 994–995
 Österreichisches Biographisches Lexikon, XII. Band, [Schwarz] Marie – Spannagel Rudolf, Wien 2005

Writings

 Herzfeld: Franz von Soxhlet †. In: Die Deutsche Zuckerindustrie Vol. 51, 1926, pp. 501–502.
 Theodor Henkel: Franz von Soxhlet zum Gedächtnis. In: Süddeutsche Molkerei-Zeitung Vol. 46, 1926, pp. 493–494 (m. Bild u. Schriftenverzeichnis).

1848 births
1926 deaths
19th-century German chemists
20th-century German chemists
Scientists from Brno
People from the Margraviate of Moravia
Academic staff of the Technical University of Munich
Moravian-German people